Hrafnhildur Guðmundsdóttir (born 9 July 1943) is an Icelandic former freestyle and medley swimmer. She competed at the 1964 Summer Olympics and the 1968 Summer Olympics.

References

External links
 

1943 births
Living people
Hrafnhildur Gudmundsdottir
Hrafnhildur Gudmundsdottir
Hrafnhildur Gudmundsdottir
Swimmers at the 1964 Summer Olympics
Swimmers at the 1968 Summer Olympics
Hrafnhildur Gudmundsdottir